South Shore railway station was originally the only intermediate station on the Blackpool and Lytham Railway, at South Shore in Lancashire, England, when it opened in 1863.

In 1903 it was renamed South Shore Lytham Road. In that same year the express Marton Line from Kirkham was built with a new Waterloo Road railway station at its junction with the Lytham line.

References

Disused railway stations in Blackpool
Former Preston and Wyre Joint Railway stations
Railway stations in Great Britain opened in 1863
Railway stations in Great Britain closed in 1916
1863 establishments in England
1916 disestablishments in England